The Luibiskogel is a mountain in the Geigenkamm group of the Ötztal Alps.

Mountains of Tyrol (state)
Mountains of the Alps
Alpine three-thousanders
Ötztal Alps